Antonio Barolini was an Italian poet and novelist who was born in Vicenza on 29 May 1910, and died in Rome on 21 January 1971. His stories, translated into English by his wife, Helen Barolini, appeared in The New Yorker and then were collected and published as Our Last Family Countess, and other Stories. He was awarded the Bagutta Prize in Milan for his book of poetry, Elegie di Croton.

Publications 
 Poetry collections:
 Croton Elegies (1959)
 The Mother Poems (1960)
 Novels:
 The Long Madness (1964)
 Nights of Fear (1967)
 Our Last Family Countess (1968)
 The Memory of Stephen (1969)

References 

 Renato Bertacchini, «BAROLINI, Antonio». In : Dizionario Biografico degli Italiani, Roma: Istituto dell'Enciclopedia Italiana, Vol. XXXIV, 1988 (on-line)
 Fernando Bandini (editor), Neri Pozza e Antonio Barolini: lettere 1955-1970, con uno scritto di Neri Pozza, Bassano del Grappa, Tassotti, 1998.
 Antonio Barolini. Cronistoria di un’anima, Atti dei Convegni di Vicenza e di New York nel centenario della nascita, a cura di Teodolinda Barolini, Firenze, Società Editrice Fiorentina, 2015, 

1910 births
1971 deaths
Italian male poets
20th-century Italian male writers
Italian male journalists
People from Vicenza
20th-century Italian poets
20th-century Italian journalists